Rehoboth is an unincorporated community in McKinley County, New Mexico, United States. Rehoboth has a post office with ZIP code 87322. It has a population of 56 permanent residents.

Education
The Rehoboth Christian School is located in Rehoboth. 

The public school district is Gallup-McKinley County Schools. Zoned schools include : Indian Hills Elementary School, John F. Kennedy Middle School, and Hiroshi Miyamura High School.

References

Unincorporated communities in McKinley County, New Mexico
Unincorporated communities in New Mexico